Będków may refer to the following places:
Będków, Pajęczno County in Łódź Voivodeship (central Poland)
Będków, Sieradz County in Łódź Voivodeship (central Poland)
Będków, Tomaszów Mazowiecki County in Łódź Voivodeship (central Poland)